Metrocentro Managua is a shopping center in Managua, Nicaragua, developed and operated by the Salvadorean Grupo Roble. The shopping center is home to 120 stores, a food court, a supermarket and a movie theater.

History

The construction of the first phase of the shopping center was finished in 1974. Due to the Revolution and Civil War of 1979, further development was halted until 1998 when it was renovated and extended with more store space and the building of the four-star Hotel Real InterContinental Metrocentro Managua.

Gallery

References

Shopping malls in Nicaragua